Agrofirm "Svitanok" is the second largest land owner in Ukraine. Based out of the village of Kovalivka in the Bila Tserkva Raion of the Kyiv oblast, in 2021 it owned , according to the State Service of Geodesy, Cartography, and Cadastre. The name "Svitanok" means "Dawn" in Ukrainian.

The agricultural holding was formed in 1993 out of a soviet era collective farm "kolkhoz imeni Schorsa" by Tetyana Zasukha who was elected as a chair of the board in 1993 in place of her husband Anatoliy Zasukha who held this post from 1985. The collective farm was formed in 1950 out of three other collective farms. In 2000 the farm was privatized. In 2013 the Anti-Monopoly Committee of Ukraine allowed Agrofirm Svitanok to expand taking over several other several other companies.

The firm owns at least three grain elevators and several sugar factories "Salivonkovsky" and "Chervonsky Tsukrovyk".

The agrofirm is the main sponsor of FC Kolos Kovalivka.

Early in 2021, the Minister of Agrarian Policy announced that the National Security and Defense Council of Ukraine might implement sanctions against the present owner Andriy Zasukha due to claims the company illegally obtained land.

References

External links
 ІСТОРІЯ СЕЛА КОВАЛІВКИ. kovalivka.info

Agriculture companies of Ukraine
Companies based in Kyiv Oblast
1993 in Ukraine